Kevin Deery (born 6 December 1984) is a Northern Irish football coach, manager and former footballer who was most recently the assistant manager of Derry City in the League of Ireland Premier Division

He played his entire professional career with his hometown club Derry City, and served as club captain between 2010-2014 having been appointed to the role by former Candystripes manager Stephen Kenny.

As captain, he helped guide Derry to promotion back to the top flight of Irish football having been demoted to the League of Ireland First Division due to financial difficulties. He retired in 2014 after a series of injury setbacks and a fall out with then manager Roddy Collins.

After retirement he began his coaching career, taking on the role of co-manager alongside Paul 'Oxo' McLaughlin at intermediate club Trojans in 2014. There he won a treble in his first season before accepting the managerial role at Institute following the sacking of Paul Kee.

After guiding 'Stute to two NIFL Championship play-offs in the 2015/16 and 2016/17 seasons, Deery resigned after failing to win promotion. He also spent a brief period as assistant manager at Sligo Rovers before returning to the Brandywell as assistant to Declan Devine.

References

Living people
1984 births
Sportspeople from Derry (city)
Association football midfielders
Republic of Ireland under-21 international footballers
Institute F.C. managers
Derry City F.C. players
Association footballers from Northern Ireland
Football managers from Northern Ireland